Merregnon is a series of works combining orchestral music and fantasy fiction. Since 2000, they have been released both as albums and presented as live concerts. The third part is Merregnon: Land of Silence, which premiered in 2021 with the Royal Stockholm Philharmonic Orchestra and was released as a concert film, followed by worldwide performances the year after. All projects were created, directed and produced by Merregnon Studios founder Thomas Böcker.

Merregnon productions have drawn in numerous musical collaborators known for their work in video games, such as Yoko Shimomura, Chris Hülsbeck, and Yuzo Koshiro.

Merregnon: Land of Silence 

Merregnon: Land of Silence features original music by Yoko Shimomura and a story by children's author Frauke Angel. For Shimomura, it is the first concert work of her career. The symphonic fairy tale in arrangements by Yasunori Nishiki and Jonne Valtonen was created to introduce families and younger audiences to orchestral music in the tradition of Saint-Saëns' The Carnival of the Animals and Sergei Prokofiev's Peter and the Wolf. Lightly animated illustrations of characters and plot points accompany the music and narration. Conducted by Andreas Hanson, the work was first performed by the Royal Stockholm Philharmonic Orchestra and filmed at the Stockholm Concert Hall in June 2021. In September of the same year, the video was made available free-to-view on the orchestra's website. Since 2022, performances take place worldwide, with orchestras such as the Orchestre de Chambre de Lausanne, the Hong Kong Philharmonic Orchestra, the Staatsphilharmonie Rheinland-Pfalz and the Shanghai Symphony Orchestra.

While Merregnon: Land of Silence has an educational background, Böcker is particularly concerned with the entertainment aspect, one reason why the project draws on the aesthetics of video games and anime to appeal to a modern audience. Shimomura believes that those efforts are helping to "tackle some of the misconceptions around classical music." In Böcker's view, the story is a symphonic fairy tale of "courage, perseverance, solidarity and above all, freedom."

The Royal Stockholm Philharmonic Orchestra has made available a further six videos in which Shimomura talks about her ideas and her approach to working on the respective themes for the characters in the story.

Reception 
Merregnon: Land of Silence was described as a "symphonic anime" by the Frankfurter Allgemeine Zeitung. Deutschlandfunk spoke with Böcker in a radio feature entitled "Music education with a video game composer", and Klassik Radio elaborated on the fact that Merregnon: Land of Silence is intended to introduce children playfully to the orchestral world, on an "enchanting adventure journey" in a "symphonic anime fairy tale for the entire family." Böcker was invited to write a guest article for Gramophone about orchestral music and its power to inspire audiences young and old. In it, he emphasises the importance of a family concert that "entertains and promotes immersion", because according to him, "it awakens an enthusiasm that leads to spontaneous engagement with the subject, without any finger-wagging or other overtly educational components." In an extensive article on Wired, Shimomura and Böcker were joined by Stefan Forsberg, executive director of the Royal Stockholm Philharmonic Orchestra. Forsberg points out that music by game composers is "a part of the daily lives of so many people around the world", and the author notes that Merregnon: Land of Silence could provide "a welcome hand for struggling concert halls." In a webinar hosted by the German Embassy in Tokyo, Shimomura, Böcker, and Angel talked about the process leading up to the concert Merregnon: Land of Silence.

Merregnon, Volumes 1 and 2 

In 1999, Böcker's interest in game music prompted him to approach composers around the world and invite them to collaborate on his original Merregnon CDs. Merregnon, Volume 1 was released in 2000, distributed by synSoniq Records, featuring orchestral music and narration, as well as an accompanying booklet with text and illustrations. Music from Merregnon, Volume 2 premiered at the first ever Symphonic Game Music Concert outside Japan in Leipzig, Germany, also produced by Böcker, before the full work was released one year later in 2004 by Totentanz Records, distributed by SoulFood / Sony Music. In 2005, Merregnon, Volume 2 was published in the Japanese market by Dex Entertainment, distributed by Sony Music Japan.

Merregnon, Volume 1 used almost no live instrument recordings for its soundtrack, while Merregnon, Volume 2 featured 74 orchestra musicians. For most of the composers, this was new territory, so the project's music director for the second volume, Andy Brick, had to ensure that "everyone delivered a score that the orchestra could properly perform." Brick states that synthesizers and samplers, as in volume 1, "can do a lot that you just can't do with real instruments." His task was to help the composers transfer their sound visions to the orchestra. Volume 1 and 2's principal composer, Fabian Del Priore, who developed many of the musical themes, confirmed that it gave him "a lot of experience in orchestration, notation and score writing."

Reception 
Both albums were highly praised by critics. The first CD was commended for its appeal in that it "impressively shows how pompous melodies and complex themes are able to attract especially young people", according to the German magazine Amiga Plus. The website Epic Sound noted that Merregnon "brings together some of the brightest young talents in the composing world" and Music4Games attested that the project "sets new standards in the world of videogame music." German gaming network Krawall found that "hardly has any music CD ever succeeded in creating such opulent pictures in the mental eye." A verdict that PC Joker joined in its review: "This disc is a hit!"

The second CD received much acclaim as well, with the gaming website DemoNews writing that it was "simply breath-taking", magazine Nautilus admiring its professionalism and going on to say that "fans of the music from big silver screen epics will find a new treasure in Merregnon 2." MacLife went on to report "game music of Hollywood quality", while music magazine Astan, in addition to praising the music ("sounding like an epos to one of the big movies, like Troy and Gladiator"), described the booklet as "luxurious" and "simply beautiful and expensively designed." This was echoed by MangasZene ("a lovingly designed booklet"), additionally highlighting the "first rate music." The German gaming website 4Players dedicated a large special to Merregnon 2 over several months, where various interviews were conducted with Böcker and the composers.

According to Böcker, working on the two Merregnon albums was a "hallmark moment" that eventually led to the development and production of his Game Concerts series.

Composers 
Andy Brick (United States)
Allister Brimble (United Kingdom)
Jason Chong (Australia)
Fabian Del Priore (Germany)
Gustaf Grefberg (Sweden)
Olof Gustafsson (Sweden)
Markus Holler (Germany)
Chris Hülsbeck (Germany)
Yuzo Koshiro (Japan)
Jogeir Liljedahl (Norway)
Yoko Shimomura (Japan)
Rudolf Stember (Germany)
Jonne Valtonen (Finland)

References

External links 
 

Orchestral music
Concerts